Carbohydrate kinase domain containing protein (abbreviated as CARKD), encoded by CARKD gene, is a human protein of unknown function. The CARKD gene encodes proteins with a predicted mitochondrial propeptide (mCARKD), a signal peptide (spCARKD) or neither of them (cCARKD). Confocal microscopy analysis of transfected CHO (Chinese-hamster ovary) cells indicated that cCARKD remains in the cytosol, whereas mCARKD and spCARKD are targeted to the mitochondria and the endoplasmic reticulum respectively. The protein is conserved throughout many species, and has predicted orthologs through eukaryotes, bacteria, and archea.


Structure

Gene 

Human CARKD gene has 10 exons and resides on Chromosome 13 at q34. The following genes are near CARKD on the chromosome:
 COL4A2: A2 Subunit of type IV collagen
 RAB20: Potential regulator of Connexin 43 trafficking.
 CARS2: Mitochondrial Cystienyl-tRNA Synthetase 2
 ING1: Tumor-Suppressor Protein

Protein 

This protein is part of the phosphomethylpyrimidine kinase: ribokinase / pfkB superfamily. This family is characterized by the presence of a domain shared by the family. CARKD contains a carbohydrate kinase domain.

Predicted properties 

The following properties of CARKD were predicted using bioinformatic analysis:
 Molecular Weight: 41.4 KDal
 Isoelectric point: 9.377
 CARKD orthologs have highly variable isoelectric points.
 Post-translational modification: Three post-translational modifications are predicted:
 Modified Phosphotyrosine Residue
 Two N-Linked Glycosylation Sites
 A Signal Peptide and signal peptide cleavage site was predicted.

Function

Tissue distribution 

CARKD appears to be ubiquitously expressed at high levels. Expression data in the human protein, and the mouse ortholog, indicate its expression in almost all tissues. One peculiar expression pattern of CARKD is its differential expression through the development of oligodendrocytes. Its expression is lower in oligodendrocyte progenitor cells than in mature oligodendrocytes.

Binding partners 

The human protein apolipoprotein A-1 binding precursor (APOA1BP) was predicted to be a binding partner for CARKD. This prediction is based on co-occurrence across genomes and co-expression. In addition to these data, the orthologs of CARKD  in E. coli contain a domain similar to APOA1BP. This indicates that the two proteins are likely to have originated from a common evolutionary ancestor and, according to Rosetta stone analysis theory, are likely interaction partners even in species such as humans where the two proteins are not produced as a single polypeptide.

Clinical significance 

Based on allele-specific expression of CARKD,  CARKD may play a role in acute lymphoblastic leukemia. In addition, microarray data indicates that CARKD is up-regulated in Glioblastoma multiforme tumors.

References

External links